KBS Radio 3 (a.k.a. KBS Voice of Love FM) (AM 1134 kHz/FM 104.9 MHz) is a national radio station for persons with disabilities, the elderly, and social minorities. Owned by the Korean Broadcasting System, Radio 3 operates daily from 6:00am to 3:00am of the following day.

Frequencies

Seoul, Incheon, Gyeonggi Province

See also 
 SBS Love FM
 SBS Power FM

Radio 3
Radio stations in South Korea
Radio stations established in 2010